Hardin Township may refer to:

Hardin Township, Faulkner County, Arkansas, in Faulkner County, Arkansas
Hardin Township, Pike County, Illinois
Hardin Township, Greene County, Iowa
Hardin Township, Hardin County, Iowa
Hardin Township, Johnson County, Iowa
Hardin Township, Pottawattamie County, Iowa
Hardin Township, Webster County, Iowa
Hardin Township, Clinton County, Missouri

Township name disambiguation pages